{{DISPLAYTITLE:C8H13NO2}}
The molecular formula C8H13NO2 (molar mass: 155.19 g/mol, exact mass: 155.0946 u) may refer to:

 Arecoline
 Bemegride
 Scopine
 Retronecine

Molecular formulas